Makada  is island in Duke of York Islands archipelago in Papua New Guinea.

Geography 
The land of Makada Island is flat.  The highest point on the island is 122 meters above sea level.  It covers about 2.7 km from the north to the south and 3.0 km from the east to the west. It covers about 3.6 square kilometers.

References

Islands of Papua New Guinea
Islands Region (Papua New Guinea)